The Beacon of Hope is a steel, columnar monument in Oklahoma City, Oklahoma.  It is located in Stiles Circle Park, near the University of Oklahoma Health Sciences Center, the Oklahoma School of Science and Mathematics, and the Oklahoma Department of Commerce headquarters.  The monument is visible from Interstate 235 and downtown Oklahoma City.  Stiles Circle Park is maintained by the City of Oklahoma City's Parks and Recreation Department. 

A shaft of green or white light can project directly up into the sky from the monument.  The beam strength is purported to be 1 billion candle power, with the ability to extend up to 5,498 feet; however that claim has been questioned. The light symbolizes the healing nature of the nearby health center.

References

Monumental columns in the United States